Winnemac is a fictional U.S. state invented by the writer Sinclair Lewis. His novel Babbitt takes place in Zenith, its largest city (population 361,000, according to a sketch-map Lewis made to guide his writing). Winnemac is also a setting for Gideon Planish, Arrowsmith, Elmer Gantry, and Dodsworth.

Description

Lewis turned to the creation of a fictional locale after residents of Sauk Centre, Minnesota, were upset with the town's portrayal in Main Street. In one of the essays in "Sinclair Lewis: A Collection of Critical Essays" Mark Schorer describes "the state of Winnemac" as "more typical than any real state in the Union".  In "The Last of the Provincials: The American Novel, 1915–1925" critic H. L. Mencken sees Winnemac as exemplifying the "standardized chain-store state" of the midwest.  In his critical study of Sinclair Lewis, Sheldon Grebstein notes that the "average mid-western state called Winnemac" is an amalgamation of Wisconsin, Minnesota, and Michigan.

According to Helen Batchelor, following the breakthrough success of Main Street, Lewis conceived an ambitious plan for a series of interrelated novels that required a common fictional locale. Reviewing Lewis's last novel and his literary career, Malcolm Cowley says:  

[Lewis] didn't write easy books after Main Street. He laid out for himself an extensive plan of work: he would invent the state of Winnemac, more typical than any real state in the Union, and in one book after another would describe the representative activities of its inhabitants, until he had completed a wide survey of American society.

In Arrowsmith, Lewis describes Winnemac thus:

Other novels mention that its capital is Galop de Vache, its river is the Chaloosa, and its important cities are Monarch, Sparta, Pioneer, Catawba, and Eureka. Lewis' novel Work of Art mentions the city of Golden Glow as 'the dirtiest and noisiest industrial huddle' in Winnemac.

Lewis's map of Winnemac
According to Batchelor, in 1921, Lewis's wife wrote to a friend that Lewis had made "the most astonishingly complete set of maps of Zenith, so that the city, the suburbs, the state" were clear in his mind.  John S. Mayfield of Syracuse University discovered the maps in Lewis's Vermont study in 1961. One map was entitled "The State in which is Zenith." Batchelor called it "the most exciting" and said that it was "of greater imaginative importance than the city [because it] provides in a greater way than Zenith the interrelatedness among these works." In 1934, an earlier commentator, George Annand, had deduced and published a "Map of Sinclair Lewis's United States," but the discovery of Lewis's own map showed significant differences. Winnemac "is much further north than had previously been thought... New York City is decidedly southeast of Zenith... Lake Michigan is simply ignored by Lewis in creating the state." Lewis's map places Zenith due east of Chicago and 17½ miles from the Illinois border. Besides those mentioned above, cities and towns on the map include Minnemegantic, Banjo Crossing, Roysburg, Tuttleville, Vulcan, Hamburg, New Paris, St. Ruan, Babylon, Chestnut Grove, Parkinton, Eureka, Aetna, Madrid, St. Agatha, and (of course) a Springfield.

References

Bibliography
A Map of Sinclair Lewis's United States as It Appears in His Novels. George Annand, Illustrator. New York, Doubleday, Doran, 1934 Geography & Map Division (60)

External links
Language of the Land – Journeys into Literary America. Library of Congress, shows a picture of A Map of Sinclair Lewis's United States as It Appears in His Novels George Annand, Illustrator New York, Doubleday, Doran, 1934 Geography & Map Division (60)

Fictional locations in the United States
Sinclair Lewis
Fictional regions